The 2009 British Formula Ford Championship was the 34th edition of the British Formula Ford Championship. It began on 13 April at Oulton Park's Easter Monday meeting and ended on 4 October at Castle Combe Circuit after 9 rounds and 25 races, all held in the United Kingdom. James Cole won the series, taking seven race victories with team Jamun Racing to finish 47 points ahead of Josef Newgarden in the final standings.

Drivers and teams

Race calendar and results
All races held in United Kingdom.

Championship standings
Points are awarded to the drivers as follows:

Best 23 scores must be dropped towards the championship.
 T. Pts – points if all races counted.
 Drop – two dropped scores.
 Pts – best 23 scores.
 S. Pts – Scholarship championship points, best 23 scores.

Championship Class

Scholarship Class

References

External links
 The home of the British Formula Ford Championship

British Formula Ford Championship seasons
Formula Ford Championship
British Formula Ford